Iran is one of the most seismically active countries in the world, being crossed by several major faults that cover at least 90% of the country. As a result, earthquakes in Iran occur often and are destructive.

Geology and history 
The Iranian plateau is subject to most types of tectonic activity, including active folding, faulting and volcanic eruptions. It is well known for its long history of disastrous earthquake activity. Not only have these earthquakes killed thousands, but they have also led to waste of valuable natural resources. Since 1900, at least 126,000 fatalities have resulted from earthquakes in Iran. In addition, the Iranian Plate is bordered by the Indian Plate (to the southeast), the Eurasian Plate (to the north), and the Arabian Plate (to the south and west), which is where the Zagros fold and thrust belt (an ancient subduction zone) lies.

Earthquakes

See also
Environmental issues in Iran
Geology of Iran
Iranian Earthquake Engineering Association (IEEA)

References

Sources

External links
Latest earthquakes in Iran and adjacent areas – Iranian Seismological Center

 
Iran
Earthquakes
Earthquakes